The Belmond Governor's Residence is a Victorian-style hotel located in Dagon Township, Yangon, Myanmar (Burma), located in a teak mansion from the 1920s. It is located in the Embassy Quarter near the Shwedagon Pagoda, the National Museum, the former Foreign Ministry office compound and India House - now the official residence of the ambassador of India.

The famed British Gentlemen's Club, the Pegu Club was located nearby.

History 

The elegant teak mansion was built in 1920. The two-story mansion, as its official name denotes, served as the official home of the governors of the British Crown Colony of Burma, such as Sir Reginald Dorman-Smith and Hubert Rance. In 2006 the hotel became part of Orient-Express Hotels Ltd. which in 2014 changed its name to Belmond Ltd. At this point the hotel changed its name to Belmond Governor's Residence.

See also

Government House, Rangoon

References

External links
Belmond Governor's Residence  Homepage

Buildings and structures in Yangon
Government Houses of the British Empire and Commonwealth
Resorts in Myanmar
Hotels in Myanmar
Belmond hotels